Yi Hwan may refer to:

Myeongjong of Joseon (1534–1567), king of Joseon
Heonjong of Joseon (1827–1849), king of Joseon